Brigadier-General Edgar William Cox   (9 May 1882 – 26 August 1918) was a senior intelligence officer on the British General Staff throughout most of the First World War who drowned in suspicious circumstances whilst swimming in August 1918 shortly after the German successes in the Spring Offensive which drove the Allied armies back a large distance. Although officially an accident, suspicions of suicide surrounded his death, which occurred just days before the beginning of the Allied counterattack which would eventually defeat the German army.

Early career
Born to George and Louisa Cox of Islington, Middlesex in North London in May 1882, Edgar Cox was educated at Christ's Hospital in Newgate and on 21 December 1900 was commissioned as a junior officer into the Royal Engineers. He came head of his class at the Royal Military Academy at Woolwich and received several awards, both there and at the School of Military Engineering. After graduation he was in December 1902 sent to the British colony of Sierra Leone to help delineate the boundary with neighbouring Liberia. This task occupied him until 1903, when he joined an Anglo-Portuguese boundary commission in Angola. In 1906 he left this post to conduct a three-year survey of the East African Protectorate (later to become Kenya). Back in Britain and serving at Aldershot barracks, he was promoted to captain, married the South African Nora and became a governor of his former school, which had by this time moved to Horsham. He also became a fellow of the Royal Geographical Society and was one of their delegates at the Paris International Map Conference in 1913.

Between 1912 and 1914, Cox demonstrated a talent for staff work and was assigned to the War Office as a staff officer (3rd class), gaining valuable experience in military intelligence and learning fluent French and German. His work was good enough that in August 1914 he was attached to the staff of Sir John French in charge of the British Expeditionary Force sent to France to counter the German invasion at the start of World War I.

First World War
In France he continued his staff duties under French throughout 1914 and 1915, participating in the planning and execution of several large offensives, but sharing in the reassignments at the start of 1916 following French's replacement by Douglas Haig, although he was compensated by a promotion to Major later in the year. During his service on the general staff he was awarded the Distinguished Service Order and was admitted into the Legion of Honour with a Croix de Chevalier. He would later also be awarded the Belgian Order of the Crown and the Italian Order of Saints Maurice and Lazarus for his war service.

Through 1916 and 1917 he served in the War Office as staff officer 2nd class to the Director of Military Intelligence and in January 1918 was recalled to France by Field Marshal Haig to take over his military intelligence department from Brigadier-General John Charteris. He was also given fast brevet promotions to Lieutenant Colonel, Colonel and Brigadier General to facilitate his position at this post. Within two months of his arrival, on 21 March, the Germans launched the surprise Operation Michael which recaptured all the ground gained during the battle of the Somme two years before and nearly drove a hole right through the Allied line. Two weeks later, Operation Georgette wiped out the British advances of the Third Battle of Ypres in 1917, seemingly undoing two years of bitter fighting in one blow.

Death

By the time the German Spring Offensive petered out in July 1918, they had reached the closest point to Paris of the entire war and had come close to breaking the Allied armies and winning the conflict. 850,000 British and French soldiers had been wounded killed or captured in just four months. Although the Hundred Days Offensive which would eventually defeat the German army began two weeks later, the damage to Edgar Cox was done. During the months of the Spring Offensive he had worked feverishly to discover the locations and details of the next attacks and had deteriorated both mentally and physically in the process. Cox was knocked out by the influenza pandemic for much of June and did not return to duty until mid-August. He had become a heavy smoker and by August was no longer eating or sleeping, suffering severely from nervous exhaustion. On 26 August 1918 he announced that he would go for a swim and was driven down to Berck Plage near GHQ at Étaples. He entered the water alone and his body was recovered from the sea some time later. He was buried in Étaples Military Cemetery with full military honours. Following his death, the Royal Geographic Society reported that the British nation in the First World War had "suffered no more grievous loss than in the death of General Cox", and that "He was one of those men, of whom there are very few, of whom nothing but praise was ever heard."

Cause of death
Although officially his death was reported and recorded as an accident, suspicions of suicide have remained given Cox's disturbed state of mind in the days before his fatal swim. The turmoil of this period was recorded by one of his subordinates, a junior officer named Howard Spring who would later become a famous novelist and who recounted the last days of Brigadier-General Cox in his autobiography In the meantime:

Notes

References

 Harris, J.P. Douglas Haig and the First World War. Cambridge, Cambridge University Press, 2008. 

1882 births
1918 deaths
People from Islington (district)
People educated at Christ's Hospital
Graduates of the Royal Military Academy, Woolwich
Royal Engineers officers
British Army generals of World War I
Fellows of the Royal Geographical Society
Deaths by drowning in France

Companions of the Distinguished Service Order
Recipients of the Order of the Crown (Belgium)
Chevaliers of the Légion d'honneur
Officers of the Order of Saints Maurice and Lazarus
Burials at Étaples Military Cemetery
British military personnel killed in World War I
British Army brigadiers
Military personnel from Middlesex